is a special ward located in Tokyo Metropolis, Japan. The ward takes its name from the river, the Arakawa, though the Arakawa River does not run through or touch the ward. Its neighbors are the wards of Adachi, Kita, Bunkyo, Taito and Sumida. In English, the ward calls itself Arakawa City.

Arakawa has sister-city relationships with Donaustadt in Vienna, Austria, and with Corvallis, Oregon, U.S. Domestically, it has similar relationships with nine cities, towns and villages.

As of May 1, 2015, the ward has an estimated population of 208,763, and a population density of about 20,550 persons per km². The total area is 10.16 km².

Geography
Arakawa is in the northeastern part of Tokyo. The shape is long and narrow, stretching from west to east. The Sumida River forms the northern boundary.

The ward is surrounded by five other special wards. To the north lies Adachi; to the west, Kita; to the southwest, Bunkyo. South of Arakawa is Taito, and southeast is Sumida.

History
The area was mainly agricultural in the Edo period. In 1651, Kozukappara, the Tokugawa's largest execution ground (now located next to Minami-Senju station), was built. Beginning in the Meiji era, the area became industrial as factories were built on the water front.

In 1932, it became one of the 35 wards of Tokyo City. 

On 1 July 1944, during World War II, the Imperial Japanese Army established a Prisoner of War camp named #20-B, on the grounds nearby Hashiba Bridge, Minami-Senju, Arakawa, at the current day location with the address of 3-41 Minami-Senju, Arakawa. The camp was renamed to #10-B, in August 1945. The prisoners of the camp were liberated in September 1945. At the time, there were 256 prisoners of war (87 British, 64 American, 55 Canadian and 50 Dutch) held at the camp. Two prisoners of war died during their imprisonment.

Districts and neighborhoods

Mikawashima Area
 Arakawa
 Higashinipporia
 Machiyab
Minamisenju Area
 Minamisenju

Nippori Area
 Nishinippori
 Higashinipporic
Ogu Area
 Higashiogu
 Nishiogu
 Machiyad

Notes:

a - (1-chōme)
b - (1, 2, 3, 4 & 8-chōme)
c -  (2, 3, 4, 5, 6, 7, 8-chōme)
d -  (5, 6, 7-chōme)

Notable people
Kosuke Kitajima (Olympic gold-medalist in swimming)
Kanako Watanabe (Olympic athlete in swimming)
Hibari Misora (singer)
Momoe Yamaguchi (singer, actress)
Eri Kamei (singer)
Toru Yano (Professional wrestler)

Economy
MIAT Mongolian Airlines's Tokyo Branch Office is on the fifth floor in the Tachibana Building in Arakawa. Iseki, a tractor and engine equipment manufacturer has its Tokyo head office in the ward.

Landmarks
Arakawa Nature Park

Education
Metropolitan high schools are operated by the Tokyo Metropolitan Government Board of Education.
 
 

Private schools:
 Kaisei Academy
 

Public elementary and junior high schools are operated by the Arakawa City Board of Education (荒川区教育委員会).

Municipal junior high schools:
 No. 1 Junior High School (第一中学校)
 No. 3 Junior High School (第三中学校)
 No. 4 Junior High School (第四中学校)
 No. 5 Junior High School (第五中学校)
 No. 7 Junior High School (第七中学校)
 No. 9 Junior High School (第九中学校)
 Hara Junior High School (原中学校)
 Minamisenju No. 2 Junior High School (南千住第二中学校)
 Ogu Hachiman Junior High School (尾久八幡中学校)
 Suwadai Junior High School (諏訪台中学校)

Municipal elementary schools:
 No. 2 Haketa Elementary School (第二峡田小学校)
 No. 3 Haketa Elementary School (第三峡田小学校)
 No. 4 Haketa Elementary School (第四峡田小学校)
 No. 5 Haketa Elementary School (第五峡田小学校)
 No. 7 Haketa Elementary School (第七峡田小学校)
 No. 9 Haketa Elementary School (第九峡田小学校)
 No. 1 Nippori Elementary School (第一日暮里小学校)
 No. 2 Nippori Elementary School (第二日暮里小学校)
 No. 3 Nippori Elementary School (第三日暮里小学校)
 No. 6 Nippori Elementary School (第六日暮里小学校)
 No. 2 Zuiko Elementary School (第二瑞光小学校)
 No. 3 Zuiko Elementary School (第三瑞光小学校)
 No. 6 Zuiko Elementary School (第六瑞光小学校)
 Akado Elementary School (赤土小学校)
 Daimon Elementary School (大門小学校)
 Haketa Elementary School (峡田小学校)
 Higurashi Elementary School (ひぐらし小学校)
 Ogu Elementary School (尾久小学校)
 Ogu No. 6 Elementary School (尾久第六小学校)
 Ogu Miyamae Elementary School (尾久宮前小学校)
 Ogu Nishi Elementary School (尾久西小学校)
 Shioiri Elementary School (汐入小学校)
 Shioiri Higashi Elementary School (汐入東小学校)
 Zuiko Elementary School (瑞光小学校)

The Tokyo First Korean Elementary and Junior High School (東京朝鮮第一初中級学校), a North Korean school, is in the ward.

The metropolis operated the Tokyo Metropolitan College of Aeronautical Engineering in Arakawa until 2010.

Transportation

Rail 
 JR East
 Yamanote Line, Keihin Tohoku Line: Nishi Nippori, Nippori Stations
 Joban Line: Nippori, Mikawashima, Minami-Senju Stations
 Tokyo Metropolitan Bureau of Transportation
Tokyo Sakura Tram (13 stations, including Minowabashi Station)
Nippori-Toneri Liner: Nippori, Nishi-Nippori, Akado-Shōgakkō-mae, Kumano-mae
 Tokyo Metro
 Chiyoda Line: Nishi Nippori, Machiya Stations
 Hibiya Line: Minami Senju Station
 Keisei Electric Railway Keisei Main Line: Nippori, Shin-Mikawashima, Machiya Stations
 Metropolitan Intercity Railway Company Tsukuba Express: Minami-Senju Station

Additional facilities are under construction.

Major Roads
Route 4 (the Nikkō Kaidō)
Meiji Street
Ogubashi Street
Otakebashi Street

Events
Sada Abe incident (1936)
Mikawashima train crash (1962)
The attempted assassination of the head of the National Police Agency following an investigation of Aum Shinrikyo-related facilities (1995)

See also

References

External links

Arakawa City Official Website 

 
Wards of Tokyo